Safipur is a constituency of the Uttar Pradesh Legislative Assembly covering the city of Safipur in the Unnao district of Uttar Pradesh, India.

Safipur is one of six assembly constituencies in the Unnao Lok Sabha constituency. Since 2008, this assembly constituency is numbered 163 amongst 403 constituencies.

Currently this seat belongs to Bharatiya Janata Party candidate Bamba Lal who won in last Assembly election of 2017 Uttar Pradesh Legislative Elections defeating Bhujan Samaj Party candidate Ram Baran by a margin of 27,236 votes.

References

External links
 

2017 establishments in Uttar Pradesh
Assembly constituencies of Uttar Pradesh
Unnao district